Liu Boming may refer to:
 Liu Boming (philosopher) (1887–1923), Chinese philosopher and educator
 Liu Boming (astronaut) (born 1966), Chinese pilot and astronaut